Bolshoy Skororyb is a rural locality (a khutor) and the administrative center of Skororybskoye Rural Settlement, Podgorensky District, Voronezh Oblast, Russia. The population was 573 as of 2010. There are 8 streets.

Geography 
Bolshoy Skororyb is located 16 km west of Podgorensky (the district's administrative centre) by road. Samoylenko is the nearest rural locality.

References 

Rural localities in Podgorensky District